Emanuel Jay Taylor (born November 8, 1967) is a former American football cornerback. He spent seven seasons in the National Football League (NFL) with the Phoenix Cardinals and the Kansas City Chiefs.

External links
Just Sports Stats

1967 births
Living people
Players of American football from San Diego
American football cornerbacks
Grossmont Griffins football players
San Jose State Spartans football players
Phoenix Cardinals players
Kansas City Chiefs players